Lycée Guillaume Apollinaire may refer to:

 Lycée Guillaume Apollinaire (Thiais)
 Lycée Guillaume Apollinaire (Nice)